Rhynchostylis coelestis is a species of orchid native to Cambodia, Thailand and Vietnam. The specific epithet coelestis, derived from the Latin caelum meaning the sky, heavenly, refers to the blue floral colouration.

Description
These epiphytic herbs form distiched, hard, deeply grooved, arching leaves that are up to 17 cm long and 2 cm wide. The branched stems can grow up to 10-25 cm tall. The 20 to 50 fragrant, white, pink or blue flowers, 2.2 cm wide, are in dense, upright racemes. The spur is flat but the distal half is curved forward.  The chromosome count of Rhynchostylis coelestis is 2n=38.

Taxonomy
The placement of this species within Rhynchostylis is further disputed, although it is currently an accepted species of the genus. One study identifies this species as the sister group to all other Rhynchostylis species on the basis of Amplified Fragment Length Polymorphism.

Pollination
Pollination occurs during daytime through bees.

References

coelestis
Orchids of Thailand
Flora of Thailand
Orchids of Cambodia
Flora of Cambodia
Orchids of Vietnam
Flora of Vietnam
Aeridinae
Plants described in 1891